Jacob Richards (1773 – July 20, 1816) was a member of the U.S. House of Representatives from Pennsylvania.

Jacob Richards was born near Chester, Pennsylvania.  He graduated from the University of Pennsylvania at Philadelphia in 1791, studied law, was admitted to the bar in 1795 and commenced practice in Philadelphia.

Richards was elected as a Democratic-Republican to the Eighth, Ninth, and Tenth Congresses.  He was commissioned as colonel of militia in Delaware County, Pennsylvania.  He engaged in the practice of law until his death near Chester in 1816.

Sources

The Political Graveyard

1773 births
1816 deaths
Pennsylvania lawyers
University of Pennsylvania alumni
Democratic-Republican Party members of the United States House of Representatives from Pennsylvania
19th-century American lawyers